Artemitomima is a genus of flies in the family Stratiomyidae.

Distribution
Vanuatu.

Species
Artemitomima mirabilis James, 1948

References

Stratiomyidae
Brachycera genera
Diptera of Australasia
Endemic fauna of Vanuatu